Ata is the common name given to the  long skeletal remains of a human fetus found in 2003 in a deserted Chilean town in the Atacama Desert. DNA analysis done in 2018 on the premature human fetus identified unusual mutations associated with dwarfism and scoliosis, though these findings were later disputed. The remains were found by Oscar Muñoz, who later sold them; the current owner is Ramón Navia-Osorio, a Spanish businessman.

Overview
DNA analysis on the premature human fetus identified unusual mutations associated with dwarfism and scoliosis, although other research contested genetic abnormalities, finding that the skeleton showed normal fetal development. There is unfounded speculation by people such as UFO theorist Steven M. Greer that Ata is an extraterrestrial. Such speculation led to Ata's inclusion in the 2013 UFO film Sirius and captured the attention of Stanford University geneticist Garry P. Nolan, who contacted the production team and analyzed the remains of the skeleton. The results of his DNA analysis show the skeleton to be human and not of extraterrestrial origin.

Analysis
Although initially thought to be older, the fetal remains have been dated to as recently as the late 1970s, and have been found to contain high-quality DNA, suitable for scientific analysis. The remains have an irregularly shaped skull and a total of 10 ribs (as opposed to 12 for adult humans), and potential signs of oxycephaly. Considering that the frontal suture of the skull is very open and the hands and feet not fully ossified, anatomist and paleoanthropologist William Jungers has suggested that it was a human fetus that was born prematurely and died before or shortly after birth. An alternative hypothesis by Nolan is that Ata had a combination of genetic disorders that led to the fetus being aborted before term, and pediatric radiologist Ralph Lachman has said that dwarfism alone could not account for all the features found in the fetus.

During the DNA analysis by Nolan, the B2 mtDNA haplotype group was found in the remains. Haplogroups identify human genetic populations that often are associated distinctly with particular geographic regions around the globe. Combined with the alleles found in the mitochondrial DNA contained in the remains, the findings suggested that Ata is indigenous to the western region of South America.

In March 2018, Nolan published additional results, stating that the fetus had a rare bone aging disorder, as well as other genetic mutations in genes associated with dwarfism, scoliosis, and abnormalities in the muscles and skeleton. The researchers identified 64 unusual mutations in 7 genes linked to the skeletal system, and they noted that finding so many mutations that specifically affect skeletal development has never been reported before.

Controversy
A subsequent study, published in September 2018 by an international research team led by New Zealand's University of Otago Associate Professor of Bioarchaeology Sian Halcrow, questioned the March 2018 study by Nolan, stating: "As experts in human anatomy and skeletal development, we find no evidence for any of the skeletal anomalies claimed by the authors. Their observations of 'anomalies' represent normal skeletal development in the fetus, cranial moulding from delivery, and potential post-mortem taphonomic effects" and that the team was "sceptical" concerning the genomic results. The authors also raised ethical concerns about the work by Nolan, saying that "studies such as these that do not address ethical considerations of the deceased and their descendant communities threaten to undo the decades of work anthropologists and others have put in to correct past colonialist tendencies."

The publisher of the earlier study, Genome Research, responded by stating that the ethical standards did not cover work on "specimens of uncertain biological origins, such as the Atacama skeleton," but also stated their intention to review their own policies on such studies. The authors of the Genome Research article published a response acknowledging the ethical concerns and calling for the repatriation of the remains. They distanced themselves from possible ethical missteps by largely claiming ignorance about the handling of the remains and the circumstances of the discovery, and noting that they were presented with roughly a cubic millimeter of bone to analyze.

See also
 Alyoshenka, a similar fetus allegedly found in a village in Russia

References

Further reading
 
 
 

Human remains (archaeological)
skeleton
2003 archaeological discoveries
2003 in science
Alleged UFO-related entities